Monte Caucaso is a mountain in Liguria, northern Italy, part of the Ligurian Apennines.  It is located in the province of Genoa. It lies at an altitude of 1245 metres.

Nature conservation 
The mountain and its surrounding area are included in a SIC (Site of Community Importance) called Monte Caucaso (code  IT1331811).

References

Mountains of Liguria
Natura 2000 in Italy
One-thousanders of Italy
Mountains of the Apennines